Vladimir Viktorovich Semyonov (May 10, 1938 – November 21, 2016) was a Russian water polo player who competed for the Soviet Union in the 1960 Summer Olympics, in the 1964 Summer Olympics, and in the 1968 Summer Olympics. He was born in Moscow. In 1960 he was a member of the Soviet team which won the silver medal. He played five matches. Four years later he won the bronze medal with the Soviet team in the water polo competition at the 1964 Games. He played all six matches and scored four goals. At the 1968 Games he was part of the Soviet team which won again a silver medal in the Olympic water polo tournament. He played all eight matches and scored four goals.

See also
 Soviet Union men's Olympic water polo team records and statistics
 List of Olympic medalists in water polo (men)

References
Vladimir Semyonov's obituary

External links
 

1938 births
2016 deaths
Russian male water polo players
Soviet male water polo players
Olympic water polo players of the Soviet Union
Water polo players at the 1960 Summer Olympics
Water polo players at the 1964 Summer Olympics
Water polo players at the 1968 Summer Olympics
Olympic silver medalists for the Soviet Union
Olympic bronze medalists for the Soviet Union
Olympic medalists in water polo
Medalists at the 1968 Summer Olympics
Medalists at the 1964 Summer Olympics
Medalists at the 1960 Summer Olympics